The Evens-McMullan House (also known as Magnolia Manor) is a historic residence in Greenville, Alabama.  It was built in the late 1860s by Holden Evens, a lumberman who specially selected the timber used in its construction.  It was purchased in 1891 by Frank McMullen, a Greenville jeweler.

The house is two stories and follows the basic I-house form, but with a front-facing gable and a pair of one-story wings off the rear.  The front porch has Victorian latticed supports and spandrels.  The interior features a curved staircase in the entry hall.

The house was listed on the National Register of Historic Places in 1986.

References

National Register of Historic Places in Butler County, Alabama
Houses on the National Register of Historic Places in Alabama
Houses completed in 1870
Houses in Butler County, Alabama